Each "article" in this category is a collection of entries about many stamp issuers, presented in alphabetical order. The entries are formulated on the micro model and so provide summary information about all known issuers.  

See the :Category:Compendium of postage stamp issuers page for details of the project.

Ghadames 

Dates 	1949 – 1951
Capital 	Ghadames
Currency 	French (100 centimes = 1 franc)

Refer 	Fezzan

Ghana 

Dates 	1957 –
Capital 	Accra
Currency 	(1957) 12 pence = 1 shilling; 20 shillings = 1 pound
		(1965) 100 pesewas = 1 cedi

Main Article  Postage stamps and postal history of Ghana

See also 	Gold Coast

Gibraltar 

Dates 	1886 –
Capital 	Gibraltar
Currency 	(1886) 12 pence = 1 shilling; 20 shillings = 1 pound
		(1971) 100 pence = 1 pound

Main Article  Postage stamps and postal history of Gibraltar

Gilbert Islands 

Dates 	1976 – 1979
Capital 	Tarawa
Currency 	100 cents = 1 dollar

Refer 	Kiribati

Gilbert & Ellice Islands 

Dates 	1911 – 1975
Capital 	Tarawa
Currency 	(1911) 12 pence = 1 shilling; 20 shillings = 1 pound
		(1966) 100 cents = 1 dollar

Main Article  Postage stamps and postal history of the Gilbert and Ellice Islands

See also 	Kiribati;
		Tuvalu

Goa 

Refer 	Portuguese India

Gold Coast 

Dates 	1875 – 1957
Capital 	Accra
Currency 	12 pence = 1 shilling; 20 shillings = 1 pound

Main Article  

See also 	Ghana

Gorizia 

Refer 	Venezia Giulia & Istria

Graham Land (Falkland Island Dependencies) 

Dates 	1944 – 1946
Currency 	12 pence = 1 shilling; 20 shillings = 1 pound

Refer 	Falkland Islands Dependencies

Granadine Confederation 

Dates 	1859 – 1861
Capital 	Bogotá
Currency 	100 centavos = 1 peso

Refer 	Colombian Territories

Grand Liban 

Refer 	Lebanon

Grande Comore 

Refer 	Great Comoro

Great Britain 

Dates 	1840 –
Capital 	London
Currency 	(1840) 12 pence = 1 shilling; 20 shillings = 1 pound
		(1971) 100 pence = 1 pound

Great Britain (Regional Issues) 

Dates 	1958 –
Currency  	(1958) 12 pence = 1 shilling; 20 shillings = 1 pound
		(1971) 100 pence = 1 pound

Includes 	Northern Ireland;
		Scotland;
		Wales

See also 	Channel Islands;
		Guernsey;
		Isle of Man;
		Jersey

Great Comoro 

Dates 	1897 – 1914
Capital 	Moroni
Currency 	100 centimes = 1 franc

Refer 	Madagascar & Dependencies

See also 	Comoro Islands

Greater Lebanon 

Dates 	1924 – 1926
Capital 	Beirut
Currency 	100 centimes = 1 piastre

Refer 	Lebanon

Greece 

Dates 	1861 –
Capital 	Athens
Currency 	(1861) 100 lepta = 1 drachma
		(2002) 100 cent = 1 euro

Includes 	Greek Post Offices in the Turkish Empire

Greek Occupation Issues 

Main Article  

Includes 	Albania (Greek Occupation);
		Dodecanese Islands (Greek Occupation);
		Kavalla (Greek Occupation);
		Khios;
		Lemnos;
		Lesbos

See also 	Adrianople;
		Aegean Islands (Dodecanese);
		Dedêagatz (Greek Occupation);
		Eastern Thrace;
		Epirus;
		Gumultsina;
		Ikaria;
		Thrace;
		Western Thrace;
		Western Thrace (Greek Occupation)

Greek Post Offices in the Turkish Empire 

Dates 	1861 – 1881
Currency 	100 lepta = 1 drachma

Refer 	Greece

Greenland 

Dates 	1938 –
Capital 	Nuuk
Currency 	100 ore = 1 krone

Main Article  Postage stamps and postal history of Greenland

Grenada 

Dates 	1861 –
Capital 	St George's
Currency 	(1861) 12 pence = 1 shilling; 20 shillings = 1 pound
		(1949) 100 cents = 1 dollar

Main Article Postage stamps and postal history of Grenada

Grenadines of Grenada 

Dates 	1973 –
Capital 	Hillsborough
Currency 	100 cents = 1 dollar

Main Article

Grenadines of St Vincent 

Dates 	1973 –
Capital 	Port Elizabeth
Currency 	100 cents = 1 dollar

Main Article

Griqualand West 

Dates 	1874 – 1880
Capital 	Kimberley
Currency 	12 pence = 1 shilling; 20 shillings = 1 pound

Refer 	Cape of Good Hope

Grodno 

Refer 	South Lithuania (Russian Occupation)

Guadeloupe 

Dates 	1884 – 1947
Capital 	Basse-Terre
Currency 	100 centimes = 1 franc

Main Article  Postage stamps and postal history of Guadeloupe

Guam 

Dates 	1899 – 1901
Capital 	Agaña
Currency 	100 cents = 1 dollar

Refer 	US Post Abroad

Guanacaste 

Dates 	1885 – 1889
Currency 	100 centavos = 1 peso

Main Article  

See also 	Costa Rica

Guatemala 

Dates 	1871 –
Capital 	Guatemala City
Currency 	(1871) 100 centavos = 8 reales = 1 peso
		(1927) 100 centavos = 1 quetzal

Main Article  Postage stamps and postal history of Guatemala

Guernsey 

Dates 	1941 –
Capital 	St Peter Port
Currency 	(1941) 12 pence = 1 shilling; 20 shillings = 1 pound
		(1971) 100 pence = 1 pound

Main Article  Postage stamps and postal history of Guernsey

See also 	Alderney;
		Channel Islands;
		Great Britain (Regional Issues)

Guinea 

Dates 	1959 –
Capital 	Conakry
Currency 	(1959) 100 centimes = 1 franc
		(1973) 100  = 1 syli

Main Article  Postage stamps and postal history of Guinea

See also 	French Guinea;
		French West Africa

Guinea-Bissau 

Dates 	1974 –
Capital 	Bissau
Currency 	(1974) 100 centavos = 1 escudo
		(1976) 100 cents = 1 peso

Main Article  Postage stamps and postal history of Guinea-Bissau

See also 	Portuguese Guinea

Gulf of Kotor 

Refer 	Dalmatia (German Occupation)

Gumultsina 

Dates 	1913 only
Currency 	100 lepta = 1 drachma

Refer 	Thrace

See also 	Dedêagatz (Greek Occupation);
		Thrace (Allied Occupation);
		Western Thrace

Guyana 

Dates 	1966 –
Capital 	Georgetown
Currency 	100 cents = 1 dollar

Main Article  Postage stamps and postal history of Guyana

See also 	British Guiana

Gwalior 

Dates 	1885 – 1948
Capital 	Gwalior
Currency 	12 pies = 1 anna; 16 annas = 1 rupee

Refer 	Gwalior in Indian Convention states

References

Bibliography
 Stanley Gibbons Ltd, Europe and Colonies 1970, Stanley Gibbons Ltd, 1969
 Stanley Gibbons Ltd, various catalogues
 Stuart Rossiter & John Flower, The Stamp Atlas, W H Smith, 1989
 XLCR Stamp Finder and Collector's Dictionary, Thomas Cliffe Ltd, c.1960

External links
 AskPhil – Glossary of Stamp Collecting Terms
 Encyclopaedia of Postal History

Gha